Abd al-Rahman ( or occasionally ; DMG ʿAbd ar-Raḥman; also Abdul Rahman) is a male Arabic Muslim given name, and in modern usage, surname. It is built from the Arabic words Abd, al- and Rahman. The name means "servant of the most gracious", ar-Rahman being one of the names of God in the Qur'an, which give rise to the Muslim theophoric names.

Notable people with the name include:

Early Islamic era 
 Abd al-Rahman ibn Awf (581–654), Arab businessman and tycoon
 Abd al-Rahman ibn Abi Bakr (died 675), Muslim commander and eldest son of Abu Bakr
 Abd al-Rahman ibn Khalid (616–667), Umayyad governor of Homs
 Abd al-Rahman ibn Muljam (died 661), the Kharijite assassin of Ali
 Abd al-Rahman ibn Rabiah (fl. 652), Arab leader in the Khazar-Arab Wars
 Abd al-Rahman ibn Ziyad, Umayyad governor of Khurasan in 679–681
 Al-Hurr ibn Abd al-Rahman al-Thaqafi (deposed 718), Umayyad governor of Al-Andalus
 Abd al-Rahman al-Ghafiqi (died 732), Arab leader in the Battle of Tours
 Abd al-Rahman ibn Kathir al-Lakhmi (fl. 746) Umayyad governor of Al Andalus
 Abd ar-Rahman ibn Uqba (fl. 755), governor of Septimania
 Abd al-Rahman ibn Habib al-Fihri (died 755), ruler of Ifriqiya
 Yusuf ibn Abd al-Rahman al-Fihri (fl. 756), governor of al-Andalus
 Abd al-Rahman al-Awza'i (707–774), Arab lawyer
 Abd al-Rahman ibn Rustam (729–784), founder of the Rustamid dynasty
 Abd al-Rahman I (731–788), Umayyad emir in Córdoba, founded Umayyad dynasty
 Abd al-Rahman II (788–852), Umayyad emir in Córdoba
 Abd al-Rahman III (890–961), Umayyad emir in Córdoba
 Abdirahman bin Isma'il al-Jabarti, traditionally held to be the common ancestor of the Somali Darod clan
 Abd al-Rahman al-Sufi, also known as Azophi (903–986), Persian astronomer
 Abd al-Rahman Sanchuelo (983–1009), chief minister of Córdoba
 Abd al-Rahman IV (died 1018), Umayyad emir in Córdoba
 Abd al-Rahman V (died 1024), Umayyad emir in Córdoba
 Yusuf ibn Abd al-Rahman al-Mizzi (1256–1342), Syrian Islamic scholar

Business 
 Mohamed bin Abdulrahman M. Hassan Fakhro (1906–1982), Bahraini businessman
 Abdulrahman Mohammed Jamsheer (born 1944), Bahraini businessman
 B. S. Abdur Rahman, Indian businessman

Entertainment 
 Abdur Rahman Slade Hopkinson (1934–1993), Guyanese actor and Muslim convert
 Abderrahmane Abdelli (born 1958), Algerian musician
 Abdel Rahman El Bacha (born 1958), Lebanese pianist
 Abderrahmane Sissako (born 1961), Mauritanian film director
 Hadj Abderrahmane (1941–1981), Algerian actor
 Hisham Abdulrahman (born 1982), Saudi actor
 Khalid Abdulrahman (born 1966), Saudi singer
 Islah Abdur-Rahman (born 1991), British-Bangladeshi film director, actor and screenwriter

Judges and lawyers 
 Abdul Rahman Saleh (prosecutor) (born 1941), Attorney General of Indonesia
 Sheikh Abdur Rehman, known as S. A. Rahman (1903–1990), Chief Justice of Pakistan
 Hassan Ali Abdul Rahman, or Hassanally A. Rahman (1909–1986), Pakistani lawyer
 Tufail Ali Abdul Rehman (1921–1975), Pakistani lawyer
 Abdel Rahman Zuabi (born 1932), Israeli judge
 Rauf Rashid Abd al-Rahman (born ca. 1941), Iraqi judge in trial of Saddam Hussein
 Abdurrahman Yalçınkaya (born 1950), Turkish judge
 Abdul Rahman al-Lahim (born 1971), Saudi human rights lawyer
 A.F.M. Abdur Rahman, judge of the High court division of Supreme Court of Bangladesh

Politicians and activists

International organizations 
 Abdul Rahman Hassan Azzam (1893–1976), Egyptian, secretary-general of the Arab League
 Safiya Abdel Rahman, member of the Egyptian Federation for Scouts and Girl Guides

Historical nations 
 Ghabdraxman of Astrakhan, Khan of Astrakhan, part of modern-day Russia, 1534–1538
 `Abd ar-Rahman ibn Muhammad (died 1825), Emir of Harar, modern-day Ethiopia
 Abdul Rahman Ibrahima Sori (1762–1829), prince from the Imamate of Futa Jallon in modern-day Guinea who was made a slave in the United States

Afghanistan 
 Abdur Rahman Khan (ca. 1842–1901), Emir of Afghanistan
 Abdul Rahman (Afghan minister) (1953–2002), murdered Afghan minister of aviation and tourism

Algeria 
 Abderrahmane Benhamida (1931-2010), Algerian politician
 Abderrahmane Farès (1911–1991), Algerian politician

Bangladesh 
 Abdur Rahman Biswas (born 1926), former President of Bangladesh
 Shaykh Abdur Rahman (died 2007), executed Jihadist terrorist
 Abdur Rahman (Noakhali politician)
 Abdur Rahman Chatgami, Islamic scholar
 Abdur Rahman (politician), from Faridpur
 Abdur Rahman Kashgarhi, first Khatib of the Baitul Mukarram National Mosque 
 Abdur Rahman Khokon

India 
 Mohammed Abdul Rahiman (1898–1945), Indian journalist, orator and politician
 Abdul Rehman Antulay, known as A. R. Antulay (born 1929), Indian politician
 Kavungal Amakkode Abdul Rahman, or K. A. Rahman (1940–1999), Indian social activist
 Abdul Rahman (politician) (born 1959), Indian politician
 Maulana Abdur Rahman, Indian politician
 Sayyid Abdur Rahman Bafaqi Thangal (1906–1973), one of the founders of the Indian Union Muslim League

Indonesia 
 Abdurrahman Wahid (1940–2008), President of Indonesia

Iraq 
 Abd Al-Rahman Al-Gillani (1841–1927), Prime Minister of Iraq
 Abd ar-Rahman al-Bazzaz (1913–1973), Iraqi politician
 Abdul Rahman Arif (1916–2007), President of Iraq
 Abdul Rahman Mustafa (elected 2003), Iraqi-Kurdish politician
 Hashim Abderrahman al-Shibli, Iraqi politician
 Abderrahman Sadik Karim, Iraqi politician

Jordan 
 Abdul Rahman Al-Hanaqtah (1963–2016), Jordanian politician

Libya 
 Abdel Rahman Shalgham (born 1949), Libyan politician
 Abdul Rahman Kamudi (born ca. 1955), Libyan politician

Malaysia 
 Abdul Rahman of Negeri Sembilan (1895–1960) King of Malaysia
 Tunku Abdul Rahman (1903–1990), Prime Minister of Malaysia
 Permaisuri Siti Aishah Abdul Rahman (born 1971), Queen of Malaysia
 Ismail Abdul Rahman (1915–1973), Malaysian politician
 Senu Abdul Rahman (1919–1995), Malaysian politician
 Abdul Rahman Ya'kub (born 1928), Chief Minister of Sarawak, Malaysia
 Tunku Abdul Rahman (1933–1989), prince of Johor, Malaysia
 Abdul Rahman Abbas (born 1938), Governor of Penang, Malaysia
 Sulaiman Abdul Rahman Taib, Malaysian politician
 Abdul Rahman Dahlan, Malaysian politician
 Tajuddin Abdul Rahman, Malaysian politician
 Abdul Halim Abdul Rahman, Malaysian politician
 Abdul Rahman Bakri, Malaysian politician accused of corruption
 Sulaiman Abdul Rahman Taib, former Deputy Tourism Minister of Malaysia
 Norah Abdul Rahman, Malaysian politician

Singapore 
 Abdul Rahman Andak (1859–1930), State Secretary of Johor to Sultans Abu Bakar and Ibrahim
 Temenggong Abdul Rahman (1755–1825), Temenggong of Johor

Morocco 
 Abderrahmane of Morocco (1778–1859), Sultan of Morocco
 Abderrahmane Youssoufi (born 1924), Moroccan Prime Minister

Nigeria 
 Abdul Rahman Mamudu (1937–1992), Nigerian military Governor
 Abdulrahman Gimba (born 1945), Nigerian politician

Pakistan 
 Ibn Abdur Rehman (1930–2021), Pakistani journalist, peace and human-rights advocate
 Abdurehman Rana (born 1942), Pakistani politician

Saudi Arabia 
 Abdul Rahman ibn Faisal (1850–1928), ruler of Saudi Arabia
 Sa'd bin Abdul-Rahman (1888–1916), Saudi prince and soldier
 Abdallah bin Abd al-Rahman (1889–1977), Saudi prince and soldier
 Muhammad bin Abdul-Rahman (1882–1943), Saudi prince and soldier
 Abdullah bin Abdul-Rahman (1893–1976), senior member of the House of Saud
 Abd al-Rahman bin Abdul Aziz (born 1931), Saudi politician
 Abdullah Abdah Rahman Jabrin (1933–2009), Saudi sheikh
 Abd al-Rahman bin Saud (1940–2005), Saudi prince
 Ghazi Abdul Rahman Al Gosaibi (1940–2010), Saudi politician
 Fahd bin Abdul Rahman Balghunaim (born 1952), Saudi Minister of Agriculture
 Abdulrahman bin Musa'ad (born 1967), Saudi prince
 Prince Faisal Bin Abdulrahman Bin Saud, Saudi prince
 Nuora bint Abdul Rahman Al Saud (1875–1950), elder sister of King Abdulaziz

Somalia 
 Abdirahman Abdi Mohamed (took office October 2014)
 Abdirahman Abdi Osman (took office January 2015)
 Abdirahman Ahmed (died 2009), Somali politician
 Abdirahman Ahmed Ali Tuur (1931–2003), Somali politician
 Abdirahman Mohamud Farole (born 1945), former President of Puntland, Somalia
 Abdirahman Duale Beyle, Foreign Minister of Somalia
 Abdirahman Jama Barre, Somali politician
 Abdurahman Ahmed Ali Tur (died 1993), Somali politician
 Abdirahman Janaqow (died 2007), Somali politician
 Abdulrahman Abd Ghani, Somali-Ethiopian politician

Sudan 
 Abd-el-Rahman el-Mahdi (1885–1959), religious and political leader in Sudan
 Abdel Rahman Swar al-Dahab (born 1930), President of Sudan

Yemen 
 Abdul Rahman al-Iryani (1910–1998), President of Yemen
 Abd Al-Rahman Ali Al-Jifri (born 1943), Yemeni politician

Other places 
 Abdul Rahman Ghassemlou (1930–1989), Kurdish political leader
 Abdulrahman Mohamed Babu (born 1924), Zanzibari revolutionary nationalist
 Abdul Rahman Saleem (born ca. 1975), Iranian-British Islamic activist

 Abdur Rahman Farès (1911–1991), Algerian politician
 Abdurrahman Vazirov (born 1930), First Secretary of the Communist Party of Azerbaijan
 Abdulrahman al-Nuaimi (1944–2011), Bahraini politician
 Muriel Abdurahman, politician in Alberta, Canada
 Omar Abdel-Rahman (born 1938–2017), blind Egyptian Muslim activist, served a life sentence in the USA
 Abdulrahman Abd Ghani, Somali-Ethiopian politician
 Hashem Abd al-Rahman (active 1989–2008), Arab-Israeli politician
 Abdirahman Ali Hassan, Kenyan politician
 Abdulrahman bin Jassim Al Thani (1871–1930), Qatari royal
 Abdullah Abdurahman (1872–1940), South African politician and physician
 Abd al-Rahman Shahbandar (1880–1940), Syrian nationalist activist

Prisoners 
 Yunis Abdurrahman Shokuri (born 1968), Moroccan held in Guantanamo
 Abdul Rahman Juma Kahm (born ca. 1969), Afghan held in Guantanamo
 Abdelrazak Ali Abdelrahman, (born 1970), Libyan held in Guantanamo
 Khalid Abdallah Abdel Rahman Al Morghi (born 1970), Saudi held in Guantanamo
 Abdul Ghappar Abdul Rahman (born 1973), Uyghur-Chinese Guantanamo detainee
 Abdul Rahman Uthman Ahmed (born 1973), Saudi held in Guantanamo
 Slimane Hadj Abderrahmane (born 1973), Dane held in Guantanamo
 Abdul Rahman al-Amri (1973–2007), Saudi held in Guantanamo who died there
 Ghanim Abdul Rahman Al Harbi (born 1974), Saudi held in Guantanamo
 Abdul Rahman Shalabi (born 1975), Saudi held in Guantanamo
 Allal Ab Aljallil Abd Al Rahman Abd (born 1975), Yemeni held in Guantanamo
 Abdul Rahman (Guantanamo detainee 357) (born 1976), Afghan detainee
 Abdul Rahman Umir Al Qyati (born 1976), Yemeni held in Guantanamo
 Khalid Saud Abd Al Rahman Al Bawardi (born 1977), Saudi held in Guantanamo
 Muhammad Abd Al Rahman Al Kurash (born 1977), Saudi held in Guantanamo
 Abdul Rahman Abdul Abu Ghiyth Sulayman (born 1979), Yemeni held in Guantanamo
 Abdul Rahman Owaid Mohammad Al Juaid (born 1980), Saudi held in Guantanamo
 Abdul Rahman Nashi Badi Al Hataybi (born ca. 1980), Saudi held in Guantanamo
 Majid Hamad Abdulrahman Al-Fareij (born ca. 1980), Saudi held in Guantanamo
 Abdul Aziz Abdul Rahman Abdul Aziz Al Baddah (born 1982), Saudi held in Guantanamo
 Abdurahman Khadr (born 1982), Guantanamo detainee
 Abdul Rahman Noorani (released 2003), Afghan detained in Guantanamo
 Abd Al Rahman Abdullah Ali Muhammad, Yemeni held in Guantanamo
 Abdul Rahman Muhammad Nasir Qasim al-Yaf'i, Yemeni subjected to extraordinary rendition by the US
 Mohammed Omar Abdel-Rahman, Egyptian imprisoned by the US at a CIA black site
 Hiwa Abdul Rahman Rashul, Iraqi imprisoned by the US as a ghost detainee
 Abdul Rahman bin Arshad (born 1961 or 1962), alias Azman, accomplice of Abdul Nasir bin Amer Hamsah in the 1994 Oriental Hotel murder
Abdul Rahman Abdullah, birth name Donny Meluda, one of the main culprits of the 2010 Kallang slashings
 Ridzuan Mega Abdul Rahman, husband of Azlin Arujunah who was accused of abusing and murdering his five-year-old son

Muslim scholars
Modern era Muslim scholars and clerics with this name are:
 Abd Al-Rahman bin Ahmad al-Zayla'i (1820–1882), Somali religious teacher
 Abdur-Rahman al-Mu'allimee al-Yamani (1894–1966), Yemeni Islamic scholar
 Abdur Rahman Chatgami (1920–2015), Islamic scholar of Bangladesh
 Abdur Rahman Kashgari (1912–1971), Uyghur Islamic scholar based in Bengal
 Abdul Rahman Al-Sudais (born 1960), imam of Grand Mosque in Mecca
 Abdul-Rahman al-Barrak, Saudi cleric
 Sheik Abd-Al-Rahman (died 2006), Iraqi cleric

Science and academia 
 Abd al-Rahman al-Fasi (1631–1685), Moroccan writer on law, history, astronomy and music
 Sheikh Muhammad Abdolrahman, Persian physician
 Abd al-Rahman al-Jabarti (1753–1825), Somali–Egyptian scholar and chronicler
 Abd al-Rahman al-Rafai (1889–1966), Egyptian historian
 Omar Abdul Rahman (academic) (born 1932), Malaysian scientific adviser
 Abdulrahman al-Ansary (born 1935), Saudi archaeologist
 Ahmed Abdul Rahman Al-Samawi (born 1946), Yemeni economist
 Megat Burhainuddin bin Megat Abdul Rahman, Vice Chancellor and Chief Executive Officer of MAHSA University College in Malaysia

Soldiers 
 Abdur Rehman Peshawari (1886–1925), Turkish soldier, journalist and diplomat
 Habib Abdoe'r Rahman Alzahier (born 1832), Yemeni participant in Aceh war
 Haji Abdul Rahman Limbong (died 1929), Malay resistance leader
 Abdurahman Fatalibeyli (1908–1954), Soviet army major who defected to the Germans in World War II
 Havildar Abdul Rahman (GC) (1921–1945), Indian George Cross recipient
 Akhtar Abdur Rahman (1924–1988), Pakistani general
 Mahmoud Abdel Rahman Fahmy (1929–2006), Commander of the Egyptian Naval Forces
 Ahmed Abdel Rahman Nasser (born 1934), Egyptian air force officer

Sports

Basketball 
 Abdulrahman Mohamed Saad (born 1982), Qatari basketball player
 Mahdi Abdul-Rahman or Walt Hazard (1942–2011), American basketball player
 Muhammad-Ali Abdur-Rahkman (born 1994), American college basketball player
 Saeed Abdulrahman (born 1985), Qatari basketball player

Cricket 
 Abdul Rahman (Afghan cricketer)
 Abdul Rahman (Afghan cricketer, born 2001)
 Abdur Rehman (cricketer, born 1980), Punjab, Pakistan
 Abdul Rehman (Emirati cricketer) (born 1987), cricketer, United Arab Emirates

Fencing 
 Mohamed Abdel Rahman (born 1915), Egyptian fencer
 Sameh Abdel Rahman (born 1943), Egyptian fencer

Football 
 Abderrahmane Mahjoub (born 1929), Moroccan-French footballer
 T. Abdul Rahman (1934–2002), Indian footballer
 Abderrahmane Soukhane (born 1936), Algerian footballer
 Abdul Rahman Ibrahim (born 1946), Malaysian footballer and coach
 Abdul Rahman Al-Zaid (born 1959), Saudi football referee
 Fahad Abdulrahman (born 1962), UAE footballer
 Abdulrahman Mohamed (born 1963), UAE footballer
 Abdulrahman Al-Haddad (born 1966), UAE footballer
 Shamsurin Abdul Rahman (Malaysian footballer) (born 1967), Malaysian footballer
 Abdulrahman Ibrahim (born 1974), UAE footballer
 Rashid Abdulrahman (born 1975), UAE footballer
 Mohd Suffian Abdul Rahman (born 1978), Malaysian footballer
 Abdurrahman Dereli (born 1981), Turkish footballer
 Abdul Rehman (footballer) (born 1982), Pakistani footballer
 Maman Abdurrahman (born 1982), Indonesian footballer
 Abderrahman Kabous (born 1983), French footballer
 Abdulrahman Al-Bishi (born 1983), Saudi footballer
 Abdulrahman Al-Qahtani (born 1983), Saudi footballer
 Mahmood Abdulrahman (born 1984), Bahraini footballer
 Abdulrahman Mesbeh (born 1984), Qatari footballer
 Mohd Shaffik Abdul Rahman (born 1984), Malaysian footballer
 Abderrahmane Mssassi (born 1985), Moroccan footballer
 Abdul Ghani Rahman (born 1985), Malaysian footballer
 Abdramane Ouattara (born 1986), Burkinabé footballer
 Shamsurin Abdul Rahman (born 1986), Singaporean footballer
 Baha' Abdel-Rahman (born 1987), Jordanian footballer
 Abdul Rahman Sulaiman (born 1988), Indonesian footballer
 Amer Abdulrahman (born 1989), UAE footballer
 Khaled Abdulrahman (born 1989), UAE footballer
 Yousif Abdelrahman Al Bairaq (born 1989), UAE footballer
 Mohamed Abdulrahman (born 1990), UAE footballer
 Omar Abdulrahman (born 1991), UAE footballer
 Rozaimi Abdul Rahman (born 1992), Malaysian footballer
 Mohamed Abdel Rahman (footballer) (born 1993), Sudanese footballer
 Abdul Rahman Baba (born 1994), Ghanaian footballer

Running 
 Abderrahmane Morceli (born 1957), Algerian runner
 Abdihakem Abdirahman (born 1977), Somali-American long-distance runner

Other sports 
 Abderrahmane Hammad (born 1977), Algerian athlete
 Abderrahman Ait Khamouch, Spanish Paralympic athlete

Terrorists and militants 
 Abdul Rahman Haji Ahmadi, Kurdish-Iranian militant leader
 Abdurrahman Buğday (born 1959), Turkish terrorist and organized crime leader, member of Grey Wolves
 Abdul Rahman Yasin (born 1960), American terrorist wanted in connection with the 1993 World Trade Center bombing
 Atiyah Abd al-Rahman (1970–2011), Libyan suspected terrorists
 Ali Abd al-Rahman al-Faqasi al-Ghamdi (born 1973), Saudi suspected terrorist wanted by the United States
 Abdul Rahman Al-Ghamdi (born 1974), Saudi militant and terrorist
 Abd al-Rahman Bin Khalil Bin Abdallah Nur (born 1980), Saudi suspected terrorist sought by the US
 Abdul Rahman Jabarah (died 2003), Canadian Al-Qaeda militant killed in Saudi-Arabia
 Ahmad Abdul-Rahman Saqr al-Fadhli (died 2004), Saudi terrorist on wanted list
 Faisal Abdulrahman Abdullah Aldakheel (died 2004), Saudi terrorist on wanted list
 Saleh Ibn Abdul Rahman Hussayen, Saudi government official accused of assisting terrorists
 Obaida Abdul-Rahman Al Otaibi, Saudi terrorist on wanted list
 Asim Abdulrahman, Egyptian Al-Qaeda militant honoured by the Taliban
 Abderrahmane Ameuroud, Algerian imprisoned in France for funding terrorist groups
 Abu Abdul Rahman, Iraqi-Canadian militant in the Iraq War

Writers 
 Abderrahman El Majdoub (died 1568), Berber Moroccan poet
 Abdul Rahman Mohmand, known as Rahman Baba (1653–1711), Pashto Sufi poet
 Abdurrahman Sayyid (1831–1901), author of the chronicles of Dagestan
 Abd al-Rahman al-Kawakibi (1855–1902), Syrian Arab Nationalist writer
 Abdel Rahman Shokry (1886–1958), Egyptian poet
 Abdurahman Čokić (1888–1954), Bosniak author/sheikh
 Abd al-Rahman al-Shaghouri (1912–2004), Syrian Sufi poet, textile worker, and trade unionist
 Aisha Abd al-Rahman, known as Bint al-Shati (1913–1998), Egyptian author and professor of literature
 Abdel Rahman Badawi (1917–2002), Egyptian existentialist philosopher and poet
 Abdirahman Yabarow, Somali journalist
 Abdul Rahman Pazhwak (1919–1995), Afghan poet and diplomat
 Abdurrahman Sharafkandi (1920–1990), Kurdish-Iranian poet
 Gely Abdel Rahman (1931–1990), Sudanese poet
 Abdul Rahman Munif (1933–2004), Arabic novelist
 Abdul Rahman Ahmed Jibril Baroud (1937–2010), Palestinian poet
 S. Abdul Rahman (born 1937), Indian Tamil-language poet
 Abdel Rahman el-Abnudi (born 1938), Egyptian poet
 Taha Abdurrahman (born 1944), Moroccan philosopher
 Mayfa' Abdel Rahman (born 1951), Yemeni short story writer and journalist
 Abdul Rahman Yusuf (born 1970), Egyptian poet
 Lana Abdel Rahman, Lebanese writer

Other people 
 Abdirahman Abdi, Canadian whose July 2016 death resulted in August 2016 protests
 Abdur Rahman Chughtai (1899–1975), Pakistani artist
 Abdul Rahman Saleh (physician) (1909–1947), Indonesian doctor and soldier
 Abdulrahman Deria (1910-1970s), Sultan of the Habr Awal clan
 Sheikh Abdurahman Sheikh Nuur (fl. 1933), Somali, inventor of Borama script
 Abdur Rahman Hye (1919–2008), Pakistani architect
 Hassan Abdel Rahman (born 1944), Palestinian diplomat
 O. Abdurahman (born 1944), Indian Malayalam journalist
 Abd al-Rahman Mowakket (born 1946), Syrian sculptor
 Amir Abdur Rehman Cheema (ca. 1978–2006), Pakistani who attempted murder of German journalist
 Abdul Rahman al-Amoudi (active 1990–2004), Eritrean-American imprisoned on financial and conspiracy charges
 Abdul Rahman al-Omari, Saudi pilot wrongly accused of terrorism
 Abdu Ali Abdul Rahman, Yemeni diplomat
 Abdullah bin Abdul Rahman Al Hussein, Saudi engineer and Minister of Water and Electricity
 Abdul Rahman (convert) (born 1965), Afghan Christian who faced the death penalty for converting from Islam
 Abdulrahman Anwar Al-Awlaki (1995–2011), U.S. citizen born in Denver, Colorado; died in a drone strike in Yemen

See also 
 Mohamed Abdel Rahman (disambiguation)
 Omar Abdul Rahman (disambiguation)
 Tengku Abdul Rahman (disambiguation)
 Princess Nora bint Abdul Rahman University, a women's university in Riyadh, Saudi Arabia
 Datuk Patinggi Haji Abdul Rahman Bridge, a bridge crossing the Sarawak River in Kuching, Sarawak, Malaysia
 B. S. Abdur Rahman University, a private university in Chennai (Madras), India
 Expedition of Abdur Rahman bin Auf

References 

Arabic masculine given names
Iranian masculine given names
Turkish masculine given names
Pakistani masculine given names